Meshel & Tommy was an Australian breakfast radio show on Nova 100 in Melbourne, Victoria, Australia. It was hosted by Meshel Laurie and Tommy Little.

The show began on 10 December 2013, replacing Hughesy & Kate, and finished on 3 December 2015. It aired from 6am to 9am on weekday mornings with music, daily topic discussions and guests.

Matt Smithson presented news, sport, weather and traffic updates.

History
In October 2013, it was announced that comedian Tommy Little and drive presenter Meshel Laurie would replace Dave Hughes and Kate Langbroek on Nova 100. Meshel Laurie was replaced by Kate Ritchie on drive in January 2014 joining Tim Blackwell and Marty Sheargold.

In 2013, Tommy Little hosted Weekend Breakfast on Nova 100 and regularly filled in for Hughesy & Kate whilst they were on holidays throughout the year.

In October 2015, Meshel Laurie announced that she would be leaving Nova 100 at the end of year to join KIIS 101.1 and Tommy Little announced his resignation. Chrissie Swan, Sam Pang and Jonathan Brown will host breakfast with Chrissie, Sam & Browny in 2016.

References

External links
 Meshel & Tommy
 

Australian radio programs
2010s Australian radio programs